The 1933 Cornell Big Red football team was an American football team that represented Cornell University during the 1933 college football season.  In their 14th season under head coach Gil Dobie, the Big Red compiled a 4–3 record and outscored their opponents by a combined total of 116 to 89.

Schedule

References

Cornell
Cornell Big Red football seasons
Cornell Big Red football